Kuźnica Słupska is a village in the administrative district of Gmina Łęka Opatowska, within Kępno County, Greater Poland Voivodeship, in west-central Poland.

The village has a population of 190.

References

Villages in Kępno County